Running Mates is a 2000 American made-for-television political comedy-drama film directed by Ron Lagomarsino and starring Tom Selleck. The film follows the presidential election campaign of James Pryce, a Democratic Party presidential candidate, who has a hard time deciding whom to pick as his vice-presidential running mate. Laura Linney, Nancy Travis, Faye Dunaway, and Teri Hatcher also star as Pryce's current or former love interests who have had a major influence on his success so far, but who also have a great deal of control over his decisions.

Created for Turner Entertainment, Running Mates was initially aired on TNT on the night of August 13, 2000, and has since been broadcast in Australia, Hungary, Iceland, and Sweden. Faye Dunaway's performance in the film earned her a Golden Globe Award nomination for Best Performance by an Actress in a Supporting Role in a Series, Miniseries or Motion Picture Made for Television, which she lost to Vanessa Redgrave for her work in If These Walls Could Talk 2.

Plot
Michigan Governor James Reynolds Pryce (Tom Selleck) is a popular liberal politician who, while running for the office of the President of the United States, finds out to what a great degree his life and career are influenced by the women in his life. As a front-runner for the Democratic Party presidential candidate, Pryce owes the success of his campaign to his manager Lauren Hartman (Laura Linney) and his wife Jennifer (Nancy Travis). Pryce has not yet chosen a vice-presidential running mate and has a hard time making the decision. Senator Parker Gable (Robert Culp) was something of a mentor to Pryce in his early political career, but Gable is a womanizer which makes Pryce uncomfortable with making him the vice-presidential candidate. Nevertheless, Gable's Washington socialite wife Meg (Faye Dunaway) considers Gable to be the best choice and tries to exert pressure over Pryce to make this happen. Pryce's other choices are Senator Mitchell Morris (Bruce McGill), a lobbyist whom Pryce dislikes due to his close ties to Big Business, and Senator Terrence Randall (Bob Gunton), who is disliked by Pryce's shallow Hollywood campaign fundraising manager Shawna Morgan (Teri Hatcher). Being previously sexually involved with Lauren, Meg, and Shawna before marrying Jennifer makes listening to their advice all that much harder for Pryce. All four women are seemingly more intent on exerting control over Pryce and winning their own personal battles against each other rather than honestly trying to help him make the correct political decision.

Cast and characters 
Tom Selleck — Governor James Pryce
Laura Linney — Lauren Hartman
Nancy Travis — Mrs. James "Jennie" Pryce
Teri Hatcher — Shawna
Faye Dunaway — Mrs. Parker "Meg" Gable
Bob Gunton — Senator Terrence Randall
Bruce McGill — Senator Mitchell Morris
Robert Culp — Senator Parker Gable
Caroline Aaron — Jody Daniels
Wayne Pére — Aide Larry
Phillip Brock — Aide Fermin
Matt Malloy — Aide Sam
Stephen Lang — Ron Noble (Financier) (uncredited)
Taylor Nichols — Dave
Rachel Wilson — Heather Gable
Steffani Brass — Brooke Pryce
J. P. Manoux — Carl - (Producer #1)
J. August Richards — Randall's Aide 
Mark Valley — Dick Tracy
Adria Dawn — Katie Bowles
Maggie Baird — Newscaster #2
Andy Berman — Darren - Producer #2
Jack Betts — Senator
Bob Clendenin — Bum
Ryan Cutrona — Reporter #2
Takayo Fischer — Press #1
Phil Proctor — Oregon Delegate
Barbara Roberts — Rhode Island Delegate
Albert S. Ruddy — Fatcat
Katelin Petersen — Young Lauren Hartman
Barbara Tyson — Newscaster #3
Alberto Vazquez — Puerto Rico Delegate
Ellis E. Williams — Reverend
Linda Eder — Vocalist
Mark Shields — Himself 
Robert D. Novak — Himself 
Kate O'Beirne — Herself 
Arianna Huffington — Herself
Al Hunt — Himself 
Margaret Carlson — Herself 
Michael Kinsley — Himself
Richard Nixon — Self (archive footage)

Production 

Running Mates was intended to give the viewers a somewhat realistic although humorous and exaggerated insight into politics and decision-making of presidential campaigns, so Gerald Rafshoon was brought on board. Rafshoon was the media manager during Jimmy Carter's presidential campaign, as well as his tenure in the White House. A private screening of the film was held for Carter, after which he agreed  the film was, indeed, "realistic". In an interview with Lou Dobbs on CNN Today, Rafshoon admits "intentional" similarities existed between the film's characters and living persons on whom the characters were partially based, even admitting, "they're all public figures so they can sue us". Tom Selleck was picked for the role of Governor Pryce because he is politically independent, having donated money to both the Republican and the Democratic parties, and Rafshoon believed, "[Selleck]'s got the look and the heft" for the role, making it easy for viewers to "buy him as presidential candidate".

See also
 Cinema of the United States
 List of American films of 2000

References

External links 

2000 films
2000 television films
American political comedy-drama films
2000s English-language films
Films about elections
Films scored by John Debney
2000s political comedy-drama films
TNT Network original films
Films directed by Ron Lagomarsino
American comedy-drama television films
2000s American films